The Luciolinae are among the largest subfamilies of fireflies (Lampyridae). They seem to be all "flashing" (as opposed to "continuous-glow") fireflies. They are a diverse lineage, spreading throughout the warm parts of Eurasia into temperate Europe and East Asia and south to the Australian region.

Several tropical species, notably of the genus Pteroptyx, are of local economic importance. Their displays will self-synchronize until the entire local firefly population flashes in the same rhythm, creating a stunning spectacle that is popular with tourists. The most well-known location to witness these displays is on the Selangor River at Kampong Kuantan, Malaysia.

Two Japanese species of Luciola, collectively known as hotaru (蛍), are highly significant in Japanese culture and folklore. They are symbols of the hitodama (人魂 or 人玉), the souls of the newly dead. See also the explanations at the article on the movie Hotaru no Haka ("Grave of the Fireflies") for a discussion of the cultural significance of the hotaru.

Systematics
The group has recently been examined using molecular phylogenetics, using fairly comprehensive sampling.

Genera

Abscondita Ballantyne, Lambkin & Fu, 2013
Aquatica Fu, Ballantyne & Lambkin, 2010
Aquilonia Ballantyne, 2009
Asymmetricata Ballantyne, 2009
Atyphella Olliff, 1890
Australoluciola Ballantyne, 2013
Colophotia Motschulsky, 1853
Convexa Ballantyne, 2009
Curtos Motschulsky, 1845
Emarginata Ballantyne, 2019
Emeia  Fu, Ballantyne & Lambkin, 2012
Gilvainsula Ballantyne, 2009
Inflata Boontop, 2015
Kuantana Ballantyne, 2019
Lampyroidea Costa, 1875
Lloydiella Ballantyne, 2009
Luciola Laporte, 1833
Magnalata Ballantyne, 2009
Medeopteryx Ballantyne, 2013
Missimia Ballantyne, 2009
 Nipponoluciola Ballantyne, 2022
Pacifica Ballantyne, 2013
Photuroluciola Pic, 1931
Pteroptyx Olivier, 1902
Pygatyphella Ballantyne, 1968
Pygoluciola Wittmer, 1939
Pyrophanes Olivier, 1885
Sclerotia Ballantyne, 2016
Serratia Ballantyne, 2019
Triangulara Pimpasalee, 2016
Trisinuata Ballantyne, 2013

References

Lampyridae